The 1979 Plateau State gubernatorial election occurred on July 28, 1979. NPP candidate Solomon Lar won the election.

Results
Solomon Lar representing NPP won the election. The election held on July 28, 1979.

References 

Plateau State gubernatorial elections
Plateau State gubernatorial election
Plateau State gubernatorial election